Irrigation in Iran covers 89,930 km2 making it the fifth ranked country in terms of irrigated area.

Tidal irrigation at Abadan island, Iran

The Abadan Island (Fig. 1) in Khūzestān Province is situated between the Arvand and Bahmanshir rivers. The Arvand river (in Arabic: Shatt al-Arab) forms the boundary between Iran and Iraq and collects the waters from the Euphrates and Tigris rivers.

On the island extensive orchards of date palm  are found thriving on tidal irrigation in the desert climate, although many date palms were destroyed during the Iran–Iraq War.

Palm tree belt
The palm tree belt stretches along the Arvand River from Abadan south-east over a distance of about 40 km and is bounded in the interior by a road.

The width of the belt varies from 2 to 6 km, and on average it is 4 km. The width is greater in the concave parts of the river bends and smaller in the convex parts. The convex parts have higher river levees and topography.

The total area of the belt is about 16,000 ha. The tree spacing is around 6x6 m. There are roughly 300 trees per ha. The maximum yield is about 200 kg/tree and 60 t/ha.

Tidal canals
A sketch of the system of tidal canals  is shown in figure 2. They are 2 to 6 km long depending on the topography and spaced at 50 to 60 m.

The tidal canals cut through and serve the levee soils along the river (Fig. 3) and they stop where the  basin soils of the backswamps begin.

Between the tidal canals additional lateral ditches have been dug perpendicularly at a spacing of 50 to 60 m to further promote the distribution of the irrigation water.

Field channels originate from the lateral ditches at a spacing of 10 to 12 m and the date palms are planted along these (Fig. 4).

Soil properties
The typical properties of the levee soils are shown in figure 5. There is a well-developed topsoil with a thickness of more than 1 m through which the subsurface irrigation water can move in and out with relative ease.

Simulation tidal propagation
The tidal movements are 2 m on average. A simulation of tidal fluctuations in the ditches is shown in figure 6 for an average and a high river discharge at various distances from the sea. The simulations were made with the Duflow  model.

Gallery

Irrigation of the Garmsar alluvial fan
Reference: Irrigation, groundwater, drainage and soil salinity control in the alluvial fan of Garmsar'’

The irrigation system for the alluvial fan of Garmsar is quite well developed (Fig. G1, below), to the extent that lined canals have been made and a large belt-canal crosses the fan through its middle.

Roughly, the cropped area occupies 30% of the land each season, while 70% is left fallow. The winter crops are mainly wheat and barley, while the summer crops are cotton and melons. However, the planting of the new crops is done before harvesting the previous crops. Thus, there is a period of overlap during which 60% of the land is under crops. The fallow land is continuously rotated throughout the years, so that there exists no permanent fallow land, except along the fringes at the base of the fan where soil salinization occurs.

An estimated average annual water balance is shown in Fig. G2 (below). It is seen that the storage of irrigation losses in the aquifer plays an important role. In the dry season the groundwater is used for irrigation by pumping from deep wells. A cross-section of the groundwater situation is shown in Fig. G3 (below).

The water rights are expressed in sang, a measure of continuous flow of about 10 L/s, but in practice it varies from 10 to more than 15 L/s. The water is delivered to about 100 tertiary units (often a village), within which the water is distributed by 12-day rotations amongst the farmers who each are entitled to receive the authorized sangs for a fixed number of hours during each rotation period. The village communities are, at the same time, water-user associations who take care of the water-distribution within the tertiary unit and they maintain the tertiary canals.

At present, the distribution of surface irrigation water to the villages is determined by the Garmsar Water Authority on the basis of the water rights and verbal agreements and communications with the water users in the absence of a written manual. The authority also maintains the irrigation canals and structures. The structures are sometimes re-designed to adjust them to verbally communicated needs. The fair distribution of the irrigation water is not an easy job as the average annual river discharge is quite variable in the range of 5 to 20 m3/s (see graph at the right).

The deep tube-wells are privately owned. The drilling of wells is subject to license. Recently, the licensing has stopped for fear of over-exploitation of the aquifer. It appears that no operational rules are applied to the wells.

In the fringe lands, the water table is shallow because the discharge capacity of the aquifer diminishes here for two reasons: (1) the hydraulic gradient reduces where the sloping alluvial fan reaches the flat desert area, and (2) the thickness and hydraulic conductivity of the aquifer diminishes. The necessary drainage canals for watertable control at the fringes of the irrigation perimeter are not maintained by the water authority, but by the respective farmers groups. For the irrigation water, these groups depend (1) on occasional river floods too large to be handled by the irrigation system and that flow down to the fringe lands through the natural watercourses, (2) on spillage from the irrigation system, and (3) on deep wells.

To stabilize the agriculture in the fringe lands, which are threatened by soil salinization, a method of strip-cropping (Fig. G4) can be recommended for soil salinity control. This method uses irrigated strips next to permanently un-irrigated strips, whereby the salinization is directed to the un-irrigated strips. This concept is sometimes called sacrificial drainage''.

Transfer from Persian Gulf

As of 2021, Pipeline transport lines links (using desalination techniques) Persian Gulf to Yazd in  central Iran. Other similar projects have been launched linking Isfahan, Mashhad or Zahedan to littoral water sources.

Project to transfer Caspian Sea water to central regions

According to the plan, water will be transferred from Sari to the city of Semnan within 24 months (starting April 2012). The plan aims to provide central provinces with water for industrial and agricultural purposes at a cost of $1.5 billion. Once the plan comes on stream, some 500 million cubic meters of water will be transferred per annum. After desalination at the point of origin in the Caspian sea, it will be transported through a  pipeline to the central Kavir desert, bringing about 200 million cubic meters (7,062 cubic feet) of water per year.

Nearly 14 percent Iran's territory is desert and suffers from prolonged droughts.

The Caspian Sea is shared by Iran, Russia, Kazakhstan, Azerbaijan and Turkmenistan. Its salinity is about a third of that of sea water.

More ambitious projects have been envisaged or proposed in recent years, such as transferring water by digging a canal between the Caspian Sea and the Persian Gulf.

See also
Water supply and sanitation in Iran
Agriculture in Iran
List of reservoirs and dams in Iran
List of countries by irrigated land area

References

 
Iran